Agaronia steeriae is a species of sea snail, a marine gastropod mollusk in the family Olividae, the olives.

Description
The length of the shell varies between 25 mm and 56 mm.

Distribution
This species occurs in the Atlantic Ocean off Brazil.

References

 Teso V. & Pastorino G. (2011) A revision of the genus Olivancillaria (Mollusca: Olividae) from the southwestern Atlantic. Zootaxa 2889: 1–34.

External links
 

Olividae
Gastropods described in 1850